The 2005–06 season of the Lebanese Premier League was the 45th season of Top-Flight League association football in Lebanon. This season featured ten clubs once more from across the nation. Three of these teams were eligible for competing in international competitions(AFC Cup for first Position and FA Cup Winners while second and third enter the Arab Champions League with a fourth spot reserved for the winner of the 2005–06 Lebanese Cup) while the bottom team at the end of the season would be relegated to make way for third teams from the 2005–06 Second Division for the expanded 12-team Football League in the 2006–07 Season.

Final table

Top scorers

Correct as of 13 May 2006.

Qualification, relegation and promotion

Qualification

2007 AFC Cup 

 Al-Ansar
 Al-Hikma (Lebanese FA Cup 2006 runners-up)

Arab Champions League 

 Al-Nejmeh (second in 2005–06 season)
 Al-Safa (third in 2005–06 season)

Promotion

To Football League 

 Shabab Al-Sahel (Champions in 2005–06 season)
 Al-Hikma (second in 2005–06 season)
 Saida (third in 2005–06 season)

Relegation

To second division 

 Racing Beirut (Last in 2005–06 season)

References

External links
Goalzz.com
Rec.Sports.Soccer.Statistics.Foundation

Lebanese Premier League seasons
Leb
1
2005–06 Lebanese Premier League